Singapore hip hop is a collective of hip hop music, graffiti arts, deejaying/turntablism, break dancing and beatboxing, which are performed by hip hop enthusiasts who are of Singapore descent mainly from the four races of the metropolis; the Chinese, Malays, Indians and the Eurasian. This article and its contents are exact up-to-date, through first-person written documents and oral accounts. This article focuses primarily on Singapore hip hop icons, discography, historical events, DMC World DJ Championship representatives, in and out of Singapore. This article also focuses on how Singapore has its hip hop origins and culture scene in South East Asia in the mid-1980s, largely due to the country's geographically international sea port location for military and worldwide trading connections, one of which is, with the United States where the hip hop culture was originated.

History
Rap music released in Singapore was primarily in English and in different languages and dialects such as Mandarin Chinese, Bahasa Melayu and Tamil. A Singapore version of the English language called Singlish surfaced from the earliest Singapore’s hip hop music release from a defunct group called “Kopi Kat Klan”.

In the late 1990s, a rap-duo called Construction Sight (Sheikh Haikel and Ashidiq Ghazali) was cited as the most influential rappers in the country and being the first to release mainstream rap music through their crowned success in Asia Bagus. Their first mainstream release was under Pony Canyon.

In Canada, Masia One of Merdeka Music is cited as the most successful Singapore-born, female rapper in the music industry of the island.

References 

Hip hop
Singaporean hip hop

Singapore hip - hop is a collective of hip - hop music , graffiti art , DJ / Turntablism , break dancing and beatboxing , which are performed by enthusiasts of hip - hop, which in Singapore origin are mainly of four races in the metropolis ; that the Chinese , Malays , Indians and Eurasian . This article and its contents are accurate to the modern, through the first person written documents and oral stories. This article is mainly devoted to Singapore hip-hop icons, discography., historical events, Championship DMC World DJ representatives, and from Singapore. The article also talks about how Singapore has its hip-hop origin and stage culture in Southeast Asia in the mid-1980s, mainly due to the geographically international position of the country's seaport for military and worldwide trade ties, one of which, from the United States , where hip-hop culture originated.

story
Rap music is released in Singapore mainly in English and in different languages and dialects such as Chinese , Bahasa Melayu and Tamil . A version of Singaporean English called Singlish surfaced from the earliest hip-hop music liberation of Singapore from a nonexistent band called "Kopi Kat Klan".

In the late 1990s, a rap duo called Construction Sight (Sheikh Heikel and Ashidiq Ghazali) was cited as the country's most influential rappers and was the first to release mainstream rap music through their successful Bagus Asia . Their first major release was under Pony Canyon .

In Canada, Masiah One of Merdek’s music is cited as the most successful Singapore-born, female rapper in the island’s music industry.

In 2011, there was a year, graffiti got the most brilliance, as AsNo Doink and Clogtwo represented in Taiwan and took the 2nd Asian Wall-Lords finals for Singapore, which was the highest honour any artist graffiti have achieved in Singapore. And in 2014, Asno Doink represented Singapore & Asia in a meeting of the Styles of the World to meet in Wisbeden Germany as part of the Made from Skratch Eurotour. He was awarded the "Best Text Writer" Award for his Javi inspired text. He together Made from Skratch, and his crew #ProjectBurnerz, collaborate with the *scape on a graffiti wall mural in August 2014, so that they would leave a mark on the most prominent wall in Singapore. Negotiations of another mural was planned in 2020.

In 2012, we saw 2 beatboxers representing Singapore at the Beatbox Battle World Championship held in Berlin . They were Zul Mystroe (showcase category) and Dharni (battle category). Dharni, which earlier in 2009, was placed 4th in the Beatbox Battle World Championship and has been crowned World Champion in 2015